Maysville is an unincorporated community in Pike County, Illinois, United States.

Notable person
Melvin R. Laird, Sr., Wisconsin State Senator and Presbyterian clergyman, was born in Marysville.

Notes

Unincorporated communities in Pike County, Illinois
Unincorporated communities in Illinois